The 2019–20 Serie A (women) was the 53rd season of the women's football top level league in Italy. The season was scheduled to run from 14 September 2019 to 16 May 2020, however on 9 March 2020, the Italian government halted the league until 3 April 2020 due to the COVID-19 pandemic in Italy. Play did not resume, and the season was terminated on 8 June 2020. On 25 June, Juventus, unbeaten first placed in the championship prior the lockdown, was awarded the championship title by the FIGC.

Teams

Stadiums and locations

League table

References

External links

 Official website

2019–20 domestic women's association football leagues
2019-20
Women
Italy